Face is a class of behaviors and customs practiced mainly in Asian cultures, associated with the morality, honor, and authority of an individual (or group of individuals), and its image in social groups. 

Face refers to a sociological concept in general linked to the dignity and prestige that a person has in terms of their social relationships. This idea with different nuances is observed in many societies and cultures such as Chinese, Arabic, Indonesian, Korean, Malaysian, Laotian, Indian, Japanese, Vietnamese, Filipino, Thai, Russian and other Slavic cultures. Face has more meanings within the context of Chinese culture.

Definitions 
Although Chinese writer Lin Yutang claimed "face cannot be translated or defined", these definitions have been created:

 Face is an image of self delineated in terms of approved social attributes.
 Face is the respectability and/or deference which a person can claim for themself or from others.
 Face is a quality that can be lost, maintained, or enhanced, and must be constantly attended to in interaction.
 Face is a sense of worth that comes from knowing one's status and reflecting concern with the congruence between one's performance or appearance and one's real worth.
 "Face" means "sociodynamic valuation", a lexical hyponym of words meaning "prestige; dignity; honor; respect; status".

By culture

Chinese 

In Chinese culture, "face" refers to two distinct concepts, although linked in Chinese social relations.

Two influential Chinese authors explained face. The Chinese writer Lu Xun referred to the American missionary Arthur Henderson Smith's interpretation. 

Lin Yutang considered the psychology of "face":

 "face; personal esteem; countenance; surface; side" occurs in words like:

  "face; side; reputation; self-respect; prestige, honor; social standing"
  "face; appearance; respect; social standing; prestige; honor (only used in ancient Chinese prose. Now it only means appearance)"
  "facial skin; complexion; feelings; sensitivity; sense of shame"
  "face; good looking; honor; dignity; prestige"
  "face; prestige; favor; kindness; partiality"

Hsien-chin Hu says “face”

 "face; countenance; respect; reputation; prestige" is seen in several face words:

  "one's face; honor; respect"
  "face; self-respect; prestige; influence"
  "face; sensitivity; compassion"

Hu contrasts  "audacious; wanton; shameless" as "the most severe condemnation that can be made of a person" and  "shameless; selfishly inconsiderate" as "a serious accusation meaning that ego does not care what society thinks of his character, that he is ready to obtain benefits for himself in defiance of moral standards".

 ) "face; prestige; reputation; honor" occurs in the common expression   and the words:

  (() or   "thick-skinned; brazen; shameless; impudent"
  "face; honor; prestige"

English 

Several American newspapers from 1874 listed the concept in a column of "Chinese Proverbs" or "Facts & Fancies" stating "The Chinese, be it observed, are great sticklers for propriety and respectability, and are very much afraid of what they term "losing face"." Loss of face occurs in The Times (August 3, 1929): "Each wishes to concede only what can be conceded without loss of 'face'".

Save face was coined from lose face applying the semantic opposition between lose and save (when successful, it's called ).

Oxford English Dictionary (OED) defines Save 8 as: "To keep, protect or guard (a thing) from damage, loss, or destruction", and elaborates, 

Among the English words of Chinese origin, lose face is an uncommon verb phrase and a unique semantic loan translation. Most Anglo-Chinese borrowings are nouns, with a few exceptions such as to kowtow, to Shanghai, to brainwash, and lose face. English face, meaning "prestige" or "honor", is the only case of a Chinese semantic loan. The vast majority of English words from Chinese are ordinary loanwords with regular phonemic adaptation (e.g., chop suey < Cantonese   ). A few are calques where a borrowing is blended with native elements (e.g., chopsticks < Pidgin chop "quick, fast" < Cantonese    + stick). Face meaning "prestige" is technically a loan synonym, owing to semantic overlap between the native English meaning "outward semblance; effrontery" and the borrowed Chinese meaning "prestige; dignity".

When face acquired its Chinese sense of "prestige; honor", it filled a lexical gap in the English lexicon. Chan and Kwok write,

Carr concludes,

Russian 
Russian Orthodox concept of face is different from the Chinese concept of face in regards to different emphasis on sacricety and individualism, and in regards to different understanding of the opposites. However, both Russian and Chinese concepts of "face" are close to each other in their focus on person being, first and foremost, part of larger community. In contrast to co-existence of personal individualism with their simultaneous participation in community affairs within Western culture, individuality is much more toned-down in both Russian and Chinese cultures in favour of communality; both Russian and Chinese cultures are lacking in stark Western dichotomy of "internal" vs. "external", and also lacking in Western focus on legal frameworks being foundation for individualism; and instead of it, in both Russian and Chinese cultures ritualism in public relations is much more highly regarded than in Western culture, where in the West ritualism is thought of to be mostly dull and empty of content.

South Slavic 
Among South Slavs, especially in Serbo-Croatian and Bulgarian, the word  is used as a traditional expression for honor and the sociological concept of face. Medieval Slavic documents have shown that the word has been used with various meanings, such as form, image, character, person, symbol, face, figure, statue, idol, guise and mask. The languages also have a derived adjective , used to associate shame to a person.

Arabic 
In Arabic, the expression  (is used to mean save face.  The entire Arab culture of social and family behavior is based around Islamic concepts of dignity, or "face". For Shia Islam, face is based on the social and family ranking system found in the Treatise of Rights, Al-Risalah al-Huquq, Shia Islam's primary source for social behaviors.

Persian 
In Persian, expressions like "", is used to mean save face and "", "" (nq) meaning "ashamed and embarrassed" and "" meaning "proud" (opposite of ) are used. In Iranian culture the meaning of linguistic face is much closer to the meaning of character. So Persian speakers use some strategies in saving the face or character of each other while they communicate.

Thai 
Another term,  means 'sale of face'. As in China and other regions where loss of face is important, the Thai version involves sociodynamic status.

Khmer (Cambodia) 
This concept is understood and treated much the same in Cambodia as elsewhere in Asia.

Korean 

Academic interpretations

Sociology 
"Face" is central to sociology and sociolinguistics. Martin C. Yang analyzed eight sociological factors in losing or gaining face: the kinds of equality between the people involved, their ages, personal sensibilities, inequality in social status, social relationship, consciousness of personal prestige, presence of a witness, and the particular social value/sanction involved.

The sociologist Erving Goffman introduced the concept of "face" into social theory with his 1955 article "On Face-work: An Analysis of Ritual Elements of Social Interaction" and 1967 book Interaction Ritual: Essays on Face-to-Face Behavior. According to Goffman's dramaturgical perspective, face is a mask that changes depending on the audience and the variety of social interaction. People strive to maintain the face they have created in social situations. They are emotionally attached to their faces, so they feel good when their faces are maintained; loss of face results in emotional pain, so in social interactions people cooperate by using politeness strategies to maintain each other's faces.

Face is sociologically universal. People "are human", Joseph Agassi and I. C. Jarvie believe, "because they have face to care for – without it they lose human dignity." Hu elaborates:

The sociological concept of face has recently been reanalyzed through consideration of the Chinese concepts of face ( and ) which permits deeper understanding of the various dimensions of experience of face, including moral and social evaluation, and its emotional mechanisms.

Face saving in collective action 

The value of "saving face" has been seen in application of a Confucian form of protest and collective action. Evidence of face saving has been seen in a labor strike by Chinese railroad worker in 1867 in the construction of the Transcontinental Railroad, where Chinese workers protested peacefully and negotiated for an outcome in a way that demonstrated face-saving behavior.

Marketing 
According to Hu, mianzi stands for "the kind of prestige that is emphasized...a reputation achieved through getting on in life, through success and ostentation", while face is "the respect of a group for a man with a good moral reputation: the man who will fulfill his obligations regardless of the hardships involved, who under all circumstances shows himself a decent human being". The concept seems to relate to two different meanings, from one side Chinese consumers try to increase or maintain their reputation in front of socially and culturally significant others (e.g. friends); on the other hand, they try to defend or save face.

 is not only important to improve the consumer's reputation in front of significant others, but rather it is also associated with feelings of dignity, honor, and pride. In consumer behaviour literature,  has been used to explain Chinese consumer purchasing behaviour and brand choice and considered it as a quality owned by some brands. Some consumers tend to favour some brands (and their products and services) because of their capacity to enable them to gain , which does not mean simply increase their reputation but also to show achievements and communicate these achievements to others in order to be more accepted in social circles, especially upper class circles. Chinese consumers tend to believe that if they buy some brands it is easier to be accepted in the social circles of powerful and wealthy people. Connections are particularly important in Chinese culture as people use social connections to achieve their goals.

However,  has also an emotional facet. Consumers feel proud, special, honoured, even more valuable as individuals if they can afford to buy  brands that can enhance their . Therefore, some branded products and services, especially those that require conspicuous consumption (e.g. smartphones, bags, shoes), are chosen because they foster feelings of pride and vanity in the owner.

A brand that enables an individual to achieve such goals in life, in branding literature, it is labelled as 'brand ', which is the capacity of a brand to provide emotions and self-enhancement to its owner.

Scholars have proved that brand  affects consumer purchase intentions and brand equity.

In summary,  is a cultural concept that relates to the social, emotional and psychological dimension of consumption and has an impact on consumers’ perception of their self and purchase decisions.

Politeness theory 
Penelope Brown and Stephen C. Levinson (1987) expanded Goffman's theory of face in their politeness theory, which differentiated between positive and negative face (p.61).

 Positive face is "the positive consistent self-image or 'personality' (crucially including the desire that this self-image be appreciated and approved of) claimed by interactants"
 Negative face is "the basic claim to territories, personal preserves, rights to non-distraction—i.e., to freedom of action and freedom from imposition"

In human interactions, people are often forced to threaten either an addressee's positive and/or negative face, and so there are various politeness strategies to mitigate those face-threatening acts.

Communication theory
Tae-Seop Lim and John Waite Bowers (1991) claim that face is the public image that a person claims for himself. Within this claim there are three dimensions. "Autonomy face" describes a desire to appear independent, in control, and responsible. "Fellowship face" describes a desire to seem cooperative, accepted, and loved. "Competence face" describes a desire to appear intelligent, accomplished, and capable. Oetzel et al. (2000) defined "facework" as "the communicative strategies one uses to enact self-face and to uphold, support, or challenge another person's face". In terms of interpersonal communication, Facework refers to an individual's identity in a social world and how that identity is created, reinforced, diminished, and maintained in communicative interactions.

Facework 
Facework represents the transition from the real self of the individual to the image he or she represents to society for the communicative or leadership purposes. This concept is all about presentation of the dignified image which soon will become as an authority for other individuals. Facework is a skill of constantly maintaining the face in order to deserve the respect and honor from it.  For instance, Individualistic cultures like United States, Canada, and Germany are standing for the position of protecting the self-face of the individual while collectivist cultures such as China, South Korea, and Japan support the idea of maintaining the other-face for self-dignity and self-respect

There are also exist other facework strategies not always basing on the culture strategies like face-negotiating, face-constituting, face-compensating, face-honoring, face-saving, face-threatening, face-building, face-protecting, face-depreciating, face-giving, face-restoring, and face-neutral.

Intercultural communication
Face is central to intercultural communication or cross-cultural communication. Bert Brown explains the importance of both personal and national face in international negotiations:

In terms of Edward T. Hall's dichotomy between high context cultures focused upon in-groups and low context cultures focused upon individuals, face-saving is generally viewed as more important in high context cultures such as China or Japan than in low-context ones such as the United States or Germany.

Face-negotiation theory
Stella Ting-Toomey developed Face Negotiation Theory to explain cultural differences in communication and conflict resolution. Ting-Toomey defines face as

Psychology
The psychology of "face" is another field of research. Wolfram Eberhard, who analyzed Chinese "guilt" and "sin" in terms of literary psychology, debunked the persistent myth that "face" is peculiar to the Chinese rather than a force in every human society. Eberhard noted

The Chinese University of Hong Kong social psychologist Michael Harris Bond observed that in Hong Kong,

Political science
"Face" has further applications in political science. For instance, Susan Pharr stressed the importance of "losing face" in Japanese comparative politics.

Semantics
Linguists have analyzed the semantics of "face". George Lakoff and Mark Johnson's Metaphors We Live By emphasizes "the face for the person" metonymy. Keith Allan (1986) extended "face" into theoretical semantics. He postulated it to be an essential element of all language interchanges, and claimed: "A satisfactory theory of linguistic meaning cannot ignore questions of face presentation, nor other politeness phenomena that maintain the co-operative nature of language interchange."

See also 
 Dignitas (Roman concept)
 Shame society vs guilt society
 Honor killing
 Izzat (honor)

References 

 Keevak, Michael. (2022). On Saving Face: A Brief History of Western Appropriation. Hong Kong University Press. https://newbooksnetwork.com/on-saving-face-brief-history-western-hb
 Mauss, Marcel. (1954). The Gift, tr. by Ian Cunnison. Cohen & West.
 Orr, John. (1953). Words and Sounds in English and French. Oxford University Press.

External links 
 A metalinguistic approach to deconstructing the concepts of 'face' and 'politeness' in Chinese, English and Japanese, Michael Haugh and Carl Hinze
 Learning About "Face" – "Subjective Theories" as a Construct in Analysing Intercultural Learning Processes of Germans in Taiwan, Doris Weidemann
 Facework as a Chinese Conflict-Preventive Mechanism – A Cultural/Discourse Analysis, Wenshan Jia
 What does our face mean to us?, Ning Yu
 Face in Chinese, Japanese, and U.S. American cultures, Akio Yabuuchi
 Face Negotiation in Conflict Resolution in the Chinese Context, Li Xiaoshi and Jia Xuerui
 Politeness, Face and Facework: Current Issues, Liisa Vilkki
 The Concern of a Nation's Face: Evidence in the Chinese Press Coverage of Sports, Karina Lam Wai-ling
 The Chinese Concept of Face: A Perspective for Business Communicators, Qiumin Dong and Yu-Feng L. Lee
 How Does Culture Influence Conflict Resolution? A Dynamic Constructivist Analysis, Michael W. Morris and Ho-Ying Fu
 Face Saving, Conflict Research Consortium
 Face, Sarah Rosenberg
 

Chinese culture
Chinese words and phrases
Confucianism in China
Confucianism in Japan
Cross-cultural psychology
Human communication
Interpersonal relationships
Japanese culture
Korean Confucianism
Korean culture
Taiwanese culture
Honor

de:Reputation#Bedeutung in Asien